The Church of Saint Anne is one of the oldest churches in Trabzon, Turkey.

Architecture 

The building is a Byzantine-style building, with a barrel vaulted nave and aisles, and a sanctuary flanked by side-chamber, formed from three curved apses. Spolia is used in the building, with a classical sarcophagus used to form a tympanum over the main entrance door, showing a standing warrior and a winged Nike.

It is possible the church was built around the 6th or 7th centuries AD. On a relief slab above the south door there is an inscription stating that St. Anne was restored during the joint reigns of Basil I, Leo VI and Alexander in 884/85.

References 

Byzantine church buildings in Turkey
Byzantine architecture in Trabzon